The Manu'a Project is an initiative by the Fanua Foundation, and it is an international environmental and clean energy foundation that focuses on helping Pacific Island Countries and territories to reduce their overall dependency on fossil fuels through project based initiatives. The Manu’a project aims at creating an island of the same name which will be the first fossil fuel free island in the whole world.

The Fanua Foundation

The Fanua Foundation, a non-Profit, formed in American Samoa by US military concerns helping Pacific island countries and territories reduce their overall dependency on fossil fuels. Due to their often extremely remote locations and difficult logistical chains, the Pacific Islands suffer have some of the highest fossil fuel costs and subsequently the highest electricity costs in the world. The  Fanua Foundation believes this negatively affects public services, such as health, education, governmental and infrastructure services. The Manu’a Project is intended to bring about cost effective access to clean electricity, cooking technologies, and transportation needs in Pacific for future generations.

Funding and support

The Manu’a project is being funded by the United States Department of Interior, Office of Insular Affairs. It also received a donation worth $40,000 by the United States Environmental Protection Agency. The United Nations Environmental program (UNEP) has also shown interest and support in the Manu’a project. The project is managed and awarded by the American Samoa Power Authority (ASPA).  The Fanua foundation is working to fund and manage the project from the 80% renewable energy point to generate the remaining 20% of power from renewable energy, to convert cars and trucks to hydrogen, donate both hydrogen trucks and electric cars, and convert oven and burners to hydrogen fuel.

Individuals involved
 John Miller, Co-founder
 Tuiafono Vai Sua, Jr., Co-founder
 Troy Switzer, Co-founder
 Daniel Fugardi, Co-founder
 Travis Torres, Co-founder

See also
American Samoa Power Authority
Fossil Fuels
Environment

References

External links
Official website
The Fauna Foundation website
AS Power website

Sustainable energy
Non-profit organizations based in the United States